Audience of One is the third studio album by the Trinidadian-American singer Heather Headley. It was released by the EMI Christian Music Group on January 13, 2009 in the United States, following Headley's transition from RCA Records. It is a collection of cover versions of popular gospel hymns as well as original songs, chiefly produced by Keith Thomas. It won a Grammy Award for Best Contemporary R&B Gospel Album at the 52nd Annual Grammy Awards. In addition, Audience of One was nominated for a Dove Award for Contemporary Gospel Album of the Year at the 41st GMA Dove Awards.

Critical reception

Upon its release, Audience of One received generally positive reviews from most music critics. The Boston Globe writer Ken Capobianco saw it as an improvement from Headley's previous work and praised her singing, calling her vocal performances "commanding" and her voice "the purest and boldest voice in pop". The Washington Posts Sarah Godfrey wrote favorably of Headley's performance on the album and stated, "Audience of One lifts its voice to the heavens." However, Metro Spirit writer Frazia Lee viewed it as "redundant with slow-paced songs", but commended Headley for her intent with gospel themes. Elysa Gardner of USA Today commended Headley for her vocals and wrote that the album's pop-oriented songs are "saved by Headley's discipline and grace, which not only pleases the ear but also reinforces the sense of humility so central to these songs".

Chart performance
The album debuted at number 27 on the U.S. Billboard 200 chart in January 2009. It marked Headley's lowest opening for a studio album up to then and was a considerable decline from her previous effort In My Mind (2006). It also reached number one on Billboards Top Gospel Albums and at number six on the Top R&B/Hip-Hop Albums chart.

Track listing
All tracks are produced by Keith Thomas.

Personnel 
Credits for Audience of One adapted from Allmusic.

Instruments and performances

Darryl "DJ" Abernathy – drums
Nico Abondolo – bass
Steve Becknell – French horn
Garrett Body – bass
Becky Bunnell – violin
Jorge Calandrelli – conductor, orchestration
Darius Campo – violin
Roberto Cani – violin
Marion Caselberry – chorus
Larry Corbett – cello
Jonathan Crone – electric guitar
David Davidson – violin
Anthony Davis – chorus
Brian Dembow – viola
Drew Dembowski – bass
Marcia Dickstein – harp
Johnny Dillard – bass
Bruce Dukov – violin, concert master
Annette Dunlap – chorus
Stephen Erdody – cello
Alma Fernandez – viola
Shannon Forrest – drums
Tiffany Gatlin – chorus
Sheldon Goodson – chorus
Tim Gordon – saxophone
Dan Greco – percussion
Justin Hageman – French horn
David Hamilton – piano, orchestration
Heather Headley – arranger, vocals
Terry Holmes – chorus
Lenair Hunt – chorus
Tyrone Jefferson – trombone, horn arrangements
Lawrence Jones – electric guitar
Roland Kato – viola
Sherrie Kibble – chorus
Paul Klintworth – French horn
Miran Kojian – violin
Johana Krejci – violin
Armen Ksadjikian – cello
Cindy Larson – chorus
Tanika Leigh – chorus
Phillipe Levy – violin
Olivia Mack – chorus
Liane Mautner – violin
Tracey McGhee – chorus
Jerry McPherson – electric guitar
Tamika Newsome – chorus
Adam Nitti – bass
Ira Noise – organ
Carmel Nunnally – chorus
Risha Nunnally – chorus
Robin Olson – violin
Jadon Poindexter – chorus
Katia Popov – violin
Michael Ripoll – acoustic guitar
Anatoly Rosinsky – violin
Denise Rutledge – chorus
Harry Shirinian – viola
Carol Smith – chorus
Gene Smith – chorus
Audrey Solomon – violin
Tina Soule – cello
Tracey Taylor – chorus
Keith Thomas – piano, arranger, Fender Rhodes, string arrangements
Cedric Thompson – drums, keyboards
Rick Todd – French horn
Irina Voloshina – violin
Dave Walther – viola
Rick Watford – guitar
Margaret Wooten – violin
Kimmie Young – chorus
Nathan Young – arranger, chorus master
Suzanne Young – chorus

Technical and production

James Auwarter – engineer
Darryl Bush – production coordination
Rob Clark – assistant engineer
Jonathan Crone – engineer, production coordination
Ken Love – mastering
Josh Miller – engineer
Smokie Norful – arranger
Ken Pennell – executive producer
Bill Airey Smith – engineer
Paul "Scooby" Smith – digital editing
Glenn A. Tabor III – mixing
Keith Thomas – programming, producer
Cedric Thompson – engineer
Scott Velazco – assistant engineer
Matthew Westerholm – arranger
Bill Whittington – engineer, mixing
Thomas Wright – engineer, assistant engineer

Charts

Weekly charts

Year-end charts

References

External links
 
 Audience of One at EMI Gospel

2009 albums
EMI Records albums
Heather Headley albums
Gospel albums by American artists